Victorian architecture is a series of architectural revival styles in the mid-to-late 19th century. Victorian refers to the reign of Queen Victoria (1837–1901), called the Victorian era, during which period the styles known as Victorian were used in construction. However, many elements of what is typically termed "Victorian" architecture did not become popular until later in Victoria's reign, roughly from 1850 and later. The styles often included interpretations and eclectic revivals of historic styles (see Historicism). The name represents the British and French custom of naming architectural styles for a reigning monarch. Within this naming and classification scheme, it followed Georgian architecture and later Regency architecture, and was succeeded by Edwardian architecture.

Although Victoria did not reign over the United States, the term is often used for American styles and buildings from the same period, as well as those from the British Empire.

Victorian architecture in the United Kingdom

Gothic Revival

During the early 19th century, the romantic medieval Gothic Revival style was developed as a reaction to the symmetry of Palladianism, and such buildings as Fonthill Abbey were built. 

By the middle of the 19th century, as a result of new technology, construction was able to incorporate metal materials as building components. Structures were erected with cast iron and wrought iron frames. However, due to being weak in tension, these materials were effectively phased out in place for more structurally sound steel. One of the greatest exponents of iron frame construction was Joseph Paxton, architect of the Crystal Palace. Paxton also continued to build such houses as Mentmore Towers, in the still popular English Renaissance styles. New methods of construction were developed in this era of prosperity, but ironically the architectural styles, as developed by such architects as Augustus Pugin, were typically retrospective.

In Scotland, the architect Alexander Thomson who practised in Glasgow was a pioneer of the use of cast iron and steel for commercial buildings, blending neo-classical conventionality with Egyptian and Oriental themes to produce many truly original structures. Other notable Scottish architects of this period are Archibald Simpson and Alexander Marshall Mackenzie, whose stylistically varied work can be seen in the architecture of Aberdeen.

While Scottish architects pioneered this style it soon spread right across the United Kingdom and remained popular for another forty years. Its architectural value in preserving and reinventing the past is significant. Its influences were diverse but the Scottish architects who practiced it were inspired by unique ways to blend architecture, purpose, and everyday life in a meaningful way.

Other Revival styles

 Jacobethan (1830–1870; the precursor to the British Queen Anne Revival style)
 Renaissance Revival (1840–1890)
 Neo-Grec (1845–1865)
 Romanesque Revival
 Second Empire (1855–1880; originated in France)
 British Queen Anne Revival (1870–1910)
 Scots Baronial (predominantly Scotland)
 British Arts and Crafts movement (1880–1910)

Some styles, while not uniquely Victorian, are strongly associated with the 19th century owing to the large number of examples that were erected during that period:
 
Italianate
Neoclassical

International spread of Victorian styles

During the 18th century, a few English architects emigrated to the colonies, but as the British Empire became firmly established during the 19th century, many architects emigrated at the start of their careers. Some chose the United States, and others went to Canada, Australia and New Zealand. Normally, they applied architectural styles that were fashionable when they left England. By the latter half of the century, however, improving transport and communications meant that even remote parts of the Empire had access to publications such as the magazine The Builder, which helped colonial architects keep informed about current fashion. Thus, the influence of English architecture spread across the world. Several prominent architects produced English-derived designs around the world, including William Butterfield (St Peter's Cathedral, Adelaide) and Jacob Wrey Mould (Chief Architect of Public Works in New York City).

Australia

The Victorian period flourished in Australia and is generally recognised as being from 1840 to 1890, which saw a gold rush and population boom during the 1880s in the states of Victoria and New South Wales. There were fifteen styles that predominated:

The Arts and Crafts style and Queen Anne style are considered to be part of the Federation Period, from 1890 to 1915.

Hong Kong
Western influence in architecture was strong when Hong Kong was a British colony. Victorian architecture in Hong Kong:

Ireland

Georgian architecture is more prominent in Ireland than Victorian architecture. The cities of Dublin, Limerick, and Cork are famously dominated by Georgian squares and terraces. Though Victorian architecture flourished in certain quarters. Particularly around Dublin's Wicklow Street and Upper Baggot Street and in the suburbs of Phibsboro, Glasnevin, Rathmines, Ranelagh, Rathgar, Rathfarnham, and Terenure. The colourful Italianate buildings of Cobh are excellent examples of the regional Victorian style in Ireland. Further examples of Victorian architecture in the country include Dublin's George's Street Arcade, the Royal City of Dublin Hospital on Baggot Street and the Royal Victoria Eye and Ear Hospital on Adelaide Road.

Sri Lanka
During the British colonial period of British Ceylon:
Sri Lanka Law College,
Sri Lanka College of Technology,
Galle Face Hotel and the 
Royal College Main Building.

North America

In the United States, 'Victorian' architecture generally describes styles that were most popular between 1860 and 1900. A list of these styles most commonly includes Second Empire (1855–85), Stick-Eastlake (1860–ca. 1890), Folk Victorian (1870–1910), Queen Anne (1880–1910), Richardsonian Romanesque (1880–1900), and Shingle (1880–1900). As in the United Kingdom, examples of Gothic Revival and Italianate continued to be constructed during this period, and are therefore sometimes called Victorian. Some historians classify the later years of Gothic Revival as a distinctive Victorian style named High Victorian Gothic. Stick-Eastlake, a manner of geometric, machine-cut decorating derived from Stick and Queen Anne, is sometimes considered a distinct style. On the other hand, terms such as "Painted Ladies" or "gingerbread" may be used to describe certain Victorian buildings, but do not constitute a specific style. The names of architectural styles (as well as their adaptations) varied between countries. Many homes combined the elements of several different styles and are not easily distinguishable as one particular style or another.

Notable Victorian-inspired cities during this era include Alameda, Astoria, Albany, Deal, Troy, Philadelphia, Washington, D.C., Boston, the Brooklyn Heights and Victorian Flatbush sections of New York City, Buffalo, Rochester, Chicago, Columbus, Detroit, Eureka, Galena, Galveston, Grand Rapids, Baltimore, Jersey City/Hoboken, Cape May, Louisville, Cincinnati, Atlanta, Milwaukee, New Orleans, Pittsburgh, Richmond, Saint Paul, San Francisco and Midtown in Sacramento. Los Angeles grew from a Pueblo (village) into a Victorian Downtown – now almost entirely demolished but with residential remnants in its Angelino Heights and Westlake neighborhoods. San Francisco is particularly well-known for its extensive Victorian architecture, especially in the Haight-Ashbury, Lower Haight, Alamo Square, Western Addition, Mission, Duboce Triangle, Noe Valley, Castro, Nob Hill, and Pacific Heights neighborhoods.

The extent to which any one is the "largest surviving example" is debated, with numerous qualifications. The Distillery District in Toronto, Ontario contains the largest and best preserved collection of Victorian-era industrial architecture in North America. Cabbagetown is the largest and most continuous Victorian residential area in North America. Other Toronto Victorian neighbourhoods include The Annex, Parkdale, and Rosedale. In the US, the South End of Boston is recognized by the National Register of Historic Places as the oldest and largest Victorian neighborhood in the country. Old Louisville in Louisville, Kentucky, also claims to be the nation's largest Victorian neighborhood. Richmond, Virginia is home to several large Victorian neighborhoods, the most prominent being The Fan. The Fan district is best known locally as Richmond's largest and most 'European' of Richmond's neighborhoods and nationally as the largest contiguous Victorian neighborhood in the United States. The Old West End neighborhood of Toledo, Ohio is recognized as the largest collection of late Victorian and Edwardian homes in the United States, east of the Mississippi. Summit Avenue in Saint Paul, Minnesota, has the longest line of Victorian homes in the country. Over-The-Rhine in Cincinnati, Ohio, has the largest collection of early Victorian Italianate architecture in the United States, and is an example of an intact 19th-century urban neighborhood. According to National Register of Historic Places, Cape May Historic District has one of the largest collections of late 19th century frame buildings left in the United States. 

The photo album L'Architecture Americaine by Albert Levy published in 1886 is perhaps the first recognition in Europe of the new forces emerging in North American architecture.

Canada
Canada's chief dominion architects designed numerous federal buildings over the course of the Victorian era. Thomas Fuller's completion of the Canadian Parliament Buildings in 1866, in particular, established a High Victorian Gothic influence over Canadian architectural design for several consecutive decades, producing many public buildings, churches, residences, industrial buildings, and hotels.

India 
Because India was a colony of Britain, Victorian Architecture is prevalent in India, Especially in cities like Mumbai, Kolkata and Chennai, In Mumbai (Formerly called Bombay) buildings like Municipal Corporation Building, Bombay University, Bombay High Court, Asiatic Society of Mumbai Building (Former Town Hall) and the David Sasoon Library are some example of Victorian Architecture in Mumbai. In Kolkata (Formerly called Calcutta) buildings like the Victoria Memorial, Calcutta High Court, St Paul's Cathedral, The Asiatic Society of Bengal are some examples of Victorian Architecture in Kolkata. In Chennai (Formerly called Madras) some examples include Madras High court, State Bank of Madras and St. Mary’s Church.

Preservation
Efforts to preserve landmarks of Victorian architecture are ongoing and are often led by the Victorian Society. A recent campaign the group has taken on is the preservation of Victorian gasometers after utility companies announced plans to demolish nearly 200 of the now-outdated structures.

See also

 Victorian decorative arts
 Victorian house
 Victorian restoration
 Folk Victorian
 Albert Levy (photographer)
 Georgian architecture

References and sources

Citations

Sources 

, includes descriptions of different Victorian and early-20th-century architectural styles common in the San Francisco Bay Area, particularly Oakland, and detailed instructions for repair and restoration of details common to older house styles.

External links
 Decorative Hardware of the Victorian Era: An American. Perspective, Raheel Ahmad
 History and Style of Victorian Architecture and Hardware
 Manchester, a Victorian City
 Photographs of Victorian Homes in Hamilton, Ontario Canada
 Victorian era architecture in San Francisco, California
 Victorian era architecture and history in Buffalo, New York
 Architectural influences on Victorian style
 Victorian churches blog

 
19th-century architectural styles
19th-century architecture in the United Kingdom
19th-century architecture in the United States
American architectural styles
Architectural history
British architectural styles
Revival architectural styles
Victorian architectural styles
Victorian architecture in the United States